The 1953 South Sydney Rabbitohs season was the 46th in the club's history. They competed in the New South Wales Rugby Football League's 1953 Premiership, and won the grand final.

Ladder

Results

References

South Sydney Rabbitohs seasons
South Sydney season